The  was a class of fifteen 1st-class destroyers built for the Imperial Japanese Navy. Obsolete by the beginning of the Pacific War, the Minekaze-class ships were then relegated to mostly secondary roles, serving throughout the war as patrol vessels, high speed transports, target control vessels, and as kaiten (suicide torpedo) carriers. Most ultimately were lost to U.S. and British submarines. The basic design of the Minekaze was used for the next three classes of Japanese destroyers, a total of 36 ships.

Background
Construction of the large-sized Minekaze-class destroyers was authorized as part of the Imperial Japanese Navy's 8-4 Fleet Program from fiscal 1917–1920, as an accompaniment to the medium-sized  with which they shared many common design characteristics.

Equipped with powerful engines, these vessels were capable of high speeds and were intended as escorts for the projected s, which were ultimately never built.

Two vessels were authorized in fiscal 1917, and an addition five in fiscal 1918. Although none had been completed by the end of World War I, the Imperial Japanese Navy decided to continue the project as many older destroyers were in need of replacement. An additional five vessels were ordered in fiscal 1919, and a final three in fiscal 1920. However, the final three vessels were built to a different design and have a different enough silhouette that they can be regarded as a separate sub-class.

The new destroyers were fast and powerful ships that were equal to any of their foreign contemporaries.

Design

Coming between the foreign-designed vessels of the earlier part of the century and the innovative  and  'Special Type' destroyers of the 1930s, the Minekaze class was a significant transitional design for the Imperial Japanese Navy, which had carefully studied (but not taken over or given Japanese names to) the five German destroyers received as war reparations after World War I. These five had been the T.181, S.51, S.60, V.80 and V.127, which were all then sold and broken up in Britain or Dordrecht.

Minekaze thus represented a complete break from the previous practice of closely following only British designs and methods. To address the issue of seaworthiness, design requirements called for a larger vessel capable of higher speeds than its predecessors. The Minekaze class incorporated a number of distinctive design innovations including a lengthened forecastle with a break forming a well deck immediately forward of the bridge. This arrangement offered the advantage of protection for the bridge as well as a low, semi protected area for the forward torpedo tubes, albeit at the cost of becoming awash in heavy seas, and was a feature of the German designs. The main battery was mounted as high as possible and all guns were mounted on the centerline of the ship to increase their effectiveness in heavy seas.

However, as with previous designs, high fuel consumption meant limited range.

Armament
The Minekaze class had a main battery of four Type 3 120 mm 45 caliber naval guns in single open mounts, exposed to the weather except for a small shield. These were located one forward, one aft, and two amidships. However, the main weaponry for the class were its three twin  torpedo tubes. One was positioned in the well in front of the bridge and the other two were located abaft the second stack. Two 6.5mm machine guns were also fitted.

By the late 1930s, the Minekaze class were regarded as second-line units, and some were converted for other duties. In 1941,  had her armament removed and was used as an aircraft rescue ship  at Tateyama Naval Air Station. The remaining twelve Minekaze ships were modified to be used primarily as convoy escorts, with the removal of the amidship guns and the two aft torpedo mounts. Minesweeping gear on the fantail was replaced by four depth-charge launchers and 36 depth charges. Type 96 25-mm anti-aircraft guns were added in increasing numbers, and eventually totaled between 13 and 20 guns per vessel in a combination of single and twin mounts. These changes increased displacement, which reduced their top speed to 35 knots.

After the start of the Pacific War, Yakaze was removed from active duty in September 1942 and converted to a target ship. In 1945, Namikaze and Shiokaze were modified into Kaiten carriers by the removal of their remaining torpedo tubes and aft gun.  Namikaze carried two Kaiten and Shiokaze carried four, which could be launched astern. Both ships also received radar, with Namikaze receiving a Type 22 and Shiokaze receiving a Type 13. Yukaze also received a Type 13.

Sawakaze was also returned to combat status, with a Type 22 radar and an experimental 5.9 inch anti-submarine rocket launcher in place of the forward gun.

Nokaze sub-class

The final three vessels in the Minekaze series incorporated a number of improvements gained through operational experience, and form a separate sub-class. The primary difference was in the arrangement of the aft armament. With the Minekaze class, the aft guns were pedestal-mounted along the centerline, with two double torpedo launchers in between. This severely limited the arc of fire of the No. 3 gun. The improved design had a better gunnery fire control system and improved ammunition magazine arrangements. Gun and torpedo positions were changed: the No. 3 gun formerly mounted aft of the second funnel was moved further aft to the "X" position. Torpedo mounts No. 2 and No. 3 were moved closer together and the searchlight platform formerly between them was moved forward to just aft of the second funnel.

Operational history
Commissioned during the 1920s, the Minekaze-class ships were the mainstay of the Imperial Japanese Navy destroyer squadrons throughout the 1930s until gradually replaced by more advanced types.

List of ships

Notes

References

External links

Destroyer classes
 
World War II destroyers of Japan